The 1970 FIM Motocross World Championship was the 14th F.I.M. Motocross Racing World Championship season.

Summary
Arne Kring led the world championship points standings after the first nine rounds, before breaking his back while competing in a non-championship race, forcing him to miss the remaining races. Bengt Åberg went on to win his second consecutive 500cc world championship for Husqvarna. Joël Robert claimed the 250cc title for Suzuki, marking the first championship for a Japanese manufacturer in the motocross world championships.

Grands Prix

500cc

250cc

Final standings

References

External links
 

FIM Motocross World Championship season
Motocross World Championship seasons